The Fire Support Command (Dutch: Vuursteun Commando, VustCo) is the artillery arm of the Royal Netherlands Army. The command consists of 41 Artillery Battalion, a staff, the Fire Support School and the artillery training grounds and is part of the Operational Support Command Land.

The command was established on 25 January 2013 through amalgamation of the 14 Field Artillery Battalion and the 11 Horse Artillery Battalion.

Structure 
With the establishment of 41 Artillery Battalion on 18 January 2019, the Royal Netherlands Army has returned to field an independent artillery unit. The battalion staff has since been responsible for planning and operational management of the fire support batteries, a task which used to be the responsibility of the staff of the Fire Support Command. The staff will, however, maintain responsibility over the management of the Fire Support School and the artillery training grounds. Personnel of the command is divided over two corps, the Korps Veldartillerie (Field Artillery Corps) and the Korps Rijdende Artillerie (Horse Artillery Corps), the latter also known as the Gele Rijders (Yellow Riders) due to their traditional uniforms with heavy yellow braiding. The corps serve a traditional purpose and are not indicative of the size of the respective units.

On 30 April 2021, the new Delta (D) Battery of the 41 Artillery Battalion was established as a result of investments into the land-based firepower. The battery has not yet reached full strength, hence the battery was called a "battery minus". Instead of nine Pantserhouwitsers per battery, the Delta Battery fields six.

Units 
The Fire Support Command consists of the following units:
 Fire Support Command (Vuursteun Commando)
 Staff Fire Support Command (Staf Vuursteun Commando)
 41 Artillery Battalion (41 Afdeling Artillerie)
 Staff Battery Korps Rijdende Artillerie
 A Battery Korps Veldartillerie: consisting of two platoons with 4x Pantserhouwitser 2000NL each, and 1x reserve/training
 B Battery Korps Veldartillerie: consisting of two platoons with 4x Pantserhouwitser 2000NL each, and 1x reserve/training 
 C Battery Korps Rijdende Artillerie: consisting of two platoons with 8x MO-120-RT each
 D Battery  Korps Rijdende Artillerie: consisting of two platoons with 3x Pantserhouwitser 2000NL
 Artillery Training Grounds (Artillerie Schietkamp)
 Fire Support School (Vuursteunschool)

Additionally, the command is responsible for the:
 Joint Fires Cells: The Joint Fires Cells (JFCs) coordinate the (simultaneous) requests for, and integration of ground-, air-, and seabased air support. The JFC conduct their operations from command centres, attached to the combat units of the brigades (11 Air Assault Brigade, 13 Light Brigade and 43 Mechanised Brigade), the Korps Commandotroepen and the Netherlands Marine Corps.
 Fire Support Teams: The Fire Support Teams (FSTs) consists of squads in the field, which maintain contact with artillery, air and naval assets in order to guide fire support to the targets.

Equipment

References 

Royal Netherlands Army
Artillery